Oleksandr Viktorovych Apanchuk (born 2 November 1993) is a Ukrainian professional footballer who plays as a centre-forward for Ukrainian club Ahrobiznes Volochysk.

References

External links
 
 
 

1993 births
Living people
Ukrainian footballers
Association football forwards
FC ODEK Orzhiv players
FC Nyva Ternopil players
FC Dinaz Vyshhorod players
FC Ahrobiznes Volochysk players
Ukrainian Second League players
Ukrainian Amateur Football Championship players
Sportspeople from Rivne Oblast